The Ingersoll Tile Elevator, located in Ingersoll, Oklahoma, was listed on the National Register of Historic Places in 1983. The elevator is constructed of hollow red clay tiles. Built around 1920, it was added to the Register because of its significance in the transition from wooden grain elevators to concrete. The elevator stands on the north side of US 64 and is in disrepair.

Notes

External links
 Ingersoll Tile Elevator-OSU

Agricultural buildings and structures on the National Register of Historic Places in Oklahoma
Buildings and structures in Alfalfa County, Oklahoma
Grain elevators in Oklahoma
Agricultural buildings and structures on the National Register of Historic Places
National Register of Historic Places in Alfalfa County, Oklahoma
Infrastructure completed in 1920